The Providence/Stoughton Line is an MBTA Commuter Rail service in Massachusetts and Rhode Island, primarily serving the southwestern suburbs of Boston. It is the longest MBTA Commuter Rail line, and the only one that operates outside Massachusetts. The line is the busiest on the MBTA Commuter Rail system, with 17,648 daily boardings in an October 2022 count.

The portion between Boston and Providence was originally built by the Boston and Providence Railroad between 1834 and 1847. The portion south of Providence was built by the New York, Providence and Boston Railroad in 1837, while the Stoughton Branch was built by the Stoughton Branch Railroad in 1845. The lines were acquired by the New York, New Haven and Hartford Railroad in the 1890s.

The MBTA began subsidizing service in the 1960s, and purchased the infrastructure and rolling stock from Penn Central in 1973. Off-peak service to Rhode Island resumed in 2000. All stations have been made accessible with high-level platforms. Newer stations like T.F. Green Airport, as well as stations shared with Amtrak, largely have full-length high level platforms; older stations have mostly been retrofitted with "mini-high" platforms one car length long.

History

The Boston and Providence Railroad (B&P) opened between Boston and Sprague Mansion in 1834, and on to Providence in 1835. A new line between Providence and East Junction via Central Falls, shared with the Providence and Worcester Railroad south of Central Falls, opened in October 1847. The B&P was leased by the Old Colony Railroad in 1888; the Old Colony was in turn leased by the New York, New Haven and Hartford Railroad in 1893. 

At the peak of service around the turn of the century, weekday service included six Boston–Providence local round trips, seven round trips from Taunton and  via , 62 Boston– round trips running every 15 minutes, 12 Boston–Dedham round trips via  and 24 via , and 11 intercity round trips from beyond Providence. Forest Hills service was soon decimated by the competing Washington Street Elevated; branch line service declined in the 1920s and 1930s. Further reductions occurred after World War II; cuts in July 1959 reduced Providence service from 12 to nine round trips, Dedham service to one round trip, and Stoughton service to two round trips.

MBTA era
On December 31, 1968, the recently formed Penn Central bought the failing New York, New Haven and Hartford Railroad. The MBTA bought the section of the Providence–Boston line in Massachusetts, as well as many other lines including the Stoughton Branch, from Penn Central on January 27, 1973. On April 1, 1976 Conrail took over Penn Central and the commuter rail equipment was sold to the MBTA. Conrail continued to operate the line under contract to the MBTA until 1977, when the Boston and Maine Railroad became the sole contractor for all MBTA commuter rail service. Full subsidies by the MBTA for the Providence and Stoughton lines began on September 28, 1976, before which the Federal government helped. On March 31, 1977, the Greater Attleboro Taunton Regional Transit Authority and Rhode Island Department of Transportation began to subsidize service beyond the MBTA district, and Stoughton began to pay to keep its station open, that cost later going to the Brockton Area Transit Authority.

On November 3, 1979, the line was closed north of Readville for long-term reconstruction as part of the Southwest Corridor project. All trains began using what is now the Fairmount Line, and special shuttle trains connected South Station to Back Bay. The new line, rebuilt below grade with space for three tracks (the old one had been above grade with room for four tracks), opened on October 5, 1987. The Orange Line shares the corridor between Back Bay and Forest Hills.

After Rhode Island cut back its subsidy, Sunday service was truncated to Attleboro in October 1977, with off-peak and Saturday service following suit in April 1979. On February 20, 1981, the MBTA stopped serving Rhode Island altogether after that state declined to renew its subsidy. On September 17, 1986, Massachusetts and Rhode Island reached an agreement to resume service. Rush-hour service to Rhode Island was restored on February 1, 1988. On June 20, 1990, a new stop opened in South Attleboro and most trains were extended to the station; regular Sunday service returned in 1992.

In 1990, a northbound commuter train was involved in a collision with a northbound Night Owl train.  The accident, which occurred to the west of Back Bay station, injured over four hundred people, although there were no fatalities.

Some off-peak weekday trains were extended to Providence starting on December 11, 2000. On July 24, 2006, the MBTA increased weekday Providence service from 11 to 15 daily round trips. Weekend service to Providence resumed on July 29, and a new layover facility was opened in Pawtucket.

Extensions

The T. F. Green Airport part of the extension opened in December 2010, with Wickford Junction service beginning in April 2012. An infill station at  opened on January 23, 2023.

A further 24-mile extension is under consideration by the Rhode Island Department of Transportation.  Possible stops include Cranston and East Greenwich, plus existing Amtrak stations in Kingston and Westerly. Rhode Island eventually plans to have its own statewide commuter service along the Northeast Corridor that would connect with MBTA service and an extension of Shore Line East. This would be the first commuter service to Westerly since the last state-sponsored train was run in December 1979. A passing siding and new platforms at Kingston, completed in 2017, may enable extension of some trains there in the near term.

Amtrak electrified the Providence Line in 2000, but the MBTA has not utilized this. In 2019, the MBTA had preliminary discussions with Amtrak about leasing Siemens ACS-64 electric locomotives to test on the Providence Line. A  section of non-electrified platform sidings at Attleboro, not included in the initial Amtrak electrification, is being electrified in mid-2022 to support future electric MBTA operations. In June 2022, the MBTA indicated plans to pilot electric service on the line using Amtrak locomotives around 2024. Full electric service (including the Stoughton Branch) using battery electric multiple units would take place in 2028–29.

Phase 2 of the South Coast Rail project, planned to open in 2030, would extend the Stoughton Branch south over the abandoned Dighton and Somerset Railroad. It would join Phase 1 (scheduled to open in late 2023) near East Taunton station and replace the section of the Phase 1 route through .

Special event service
In August 1971, the MBTA began operating Boston– and Providence–Foxboro service for events at the new Foxboro Stadium. Providence service ended early in the 1973 season due to insufficient ridership; Boston service ended that October. Boston service via the Franklin Line resumed in 1986. It was rerouted over the Providence/Stoughton Line in 1989, with intermediate stops at Back Bay, Hyde Park, Route 128, Canton Junction, Sharon, and Mansfield; a reverse move was made at Mansfield to access the Framingham Secondary. Boston–Foxboro service was again rerouted over the Franklin Line in 1995. Providence–Foxboro event service resumed for the 1997 season, with intermediate stops at South Attleboro, Attleboro, and Mansfield. Event service was extended to T.F. Green Airport in 2012, but cut back to Providence in 2019.

COVID-19 pandemic
Substantially reduced schedules were in effect from March 16 to June 23, 2020. Service changes effective November 2, 2020, shifted some peak service to off-peak, providing 60-minute all-day headways between Providence and Boston. Reduced schedules were again put in effect on December 14, 2020. As part of a schedule change on January 23, 2021, Sunday morning Boston–Providence service began operation for the first time since the New Haven era. On February 26, 2021, South Attleboro station was temporarily closed due to structural deterioration. Full service was restored on April 5, 2021. As part of that schedule change, all Providence/Stoughton Line trains began stopping at Ruggles station after an additional platform there was completed. Additionally, the final Providence-bound train on weekdays began stopping at Forest Hills station to provide a transfer to a shuttle train to Needham. During the closure of the Orange Line from August 19 to September 18, 2022, additional Providence/Stoughton Line trains stopped at Forest Hills. One of these trains – a midday Providence outbound – continued to stop after September 19. Daily ridership reached 17,648 in October 2022 – 69% of pre-COVID ridership.

Service
, weekday service has 20 Boston–Providence round trips, half of which run to Wickford Junction, and 16 Boston–Stoughton round trips. Weekend service has nine Boston–Providence round trips, with no Wickford Junction or Stoughton service. 

The main branch forms the far northern leg of Amtrak's Northeast Corridor. All Acela Express trains and all Northeast Regional routes between Boston and New York City run along this line. South Station, Back Bay, Route 128 and Providence have long ranked among the busiest Amtrak stations in the country. With fast and frequent MBTA and Amtrak service, the Providence-Boston share of the Northeast Corridor is one of the busiest rail lines in the country.

Ownership and financing
The MBTA owns the section from Boston to the Rhode Island border (called the Attleboro Line), while Amtrak owns all track in Rhode Island. The entire line is part of the Northeast Corridor.

As part of the 1988 Pilgrim Partnership Agreement, Rhode Island provides capital funding (including some of its federal formula funds) for MBTA expansion in the state.  Massachusetts (through the MBTA) provides the operating subsidy for MBTA Commuter Rail service in return. Rhode Island also pays Amtrak to allow the MBTA to use its tracks.

Station listing

Stoughton Branch

References

External links

MBTA - Providence/Stoughton Line schedule

MBTA Commuter Rail
Northeast Corridor